Barrett Wendell (August 23, 1855 – February 8, 1921) was an American academic known for a series of textbooks including English Composition, studies of Cotton Mather and William Shakespeare, A Literary History of America, The France of Today, and The Traditions of European Literature.

Early life
Wendell was born in Boston on August 23, 1855. He was the son of Jacob and Mary Bertodi ( Barrett) Wendell. His parents married in Boston in 1854, about a year after his father had moved from Portsmouth, New Hampshire, and joined the firm of J.C. Howe & Co. Among his three younger brothers were Gordon Wendell, philanthropist and athlete Evert Jansen Wendell, and actor Jacob Wendell.

His paternal grandparents were Jacob Wendell Sr. and Mehitable Rindge ( Rogers) Wendell. The first Wendell, Evert Jansen, left the Netherlands in 1640 and settled in Albany, New York. His maternal grandparents were Boston merchant Nathaniel Augustus Barrett and Sally ( Dorr) Barrett. Both the Barrett and Dorr families had deep roots in colonial America, with the Dorrs making their fortune in the fur trade. 

Wendell graduated from Harvard in the class of 1877 with Abbott Lawrence Lowell, who was later a president of Harvard. At Harvard, Wendell was a member of The Lampoon.

Career
In 1880, he was appointed Instructor in English at Harvard. He later became an Assistant Professor of English from 1888 to 1898, and a Professor of English from 1898 to 1917, after which he was a professor emeritus. He was also elected to the Harvard Board of Overseers.

In 1904 to 1905, he travelled overseas, and lectured at Cambridge University in England, the Sorbonne in Paris, and other French universities. After this visit he wrote The France of Today.

He was a trustee of the Boston Athenaeum, a member of the Massachusetts Historical Society, and a Fellow of the American Academy of Arts and Sciences in 1916. He received honorary degrees from Harvard and Columbia University, and an LL.D. from the University of Strasbourg in France.

Personal life
On June 1, 1880, Wendell was married to Edith Greenough (1859–1938) at Quincy, Massachusetts. Edith was a daughter of William Whitwell Greenough and Catharine Scollay ( Curtis) Greenough. Edith was a national leader of movements to preserve historical sites. Together, they were the parents of four children:

 Barrett Wendell Jr. (1881–1973), an investment banker who married Barbara Higginson, granddaughter of the founder of Lee, Higginson & Co.
 Mary Barrett Wendell (1883–1975), who married Geoffrey Manilus Wheelock. They divorced and she married Reinier van der Woude.
 William Greenough Wendell (1888–1967), who married Ruth Appleton, a daughter of Francis R. Appleton. They divorced in 1938 and he married Evelyn Fahnestock, a daughter of Ernest Fahnestock.
 Edith Wendell (1893–1963), who married publisher and Mayor of Auburn, New York Charles Devens Osborne in 1913.

Wendell died in Boston on February 8, 1921. His widow died in Boston in October 1938.

Descendants
Through his daughter Mary, he was a grandfather of Reiner Garrit Anton van der Woude Jr., who married his second cousin, Lady Anne Penelope Herbert, a daughter of Henry Herbert, 6th Earl of Carnarvon and the former Anne Catherine Tredick Wendell (Wendell's niece).

Selected works
 The Duchess Emilia: A romance, Boston: James R. Osgood and Co., 1885.
 Cotton Mather, the Puritan priest, New York, Dodd, Mead and Co., 1891.
 English composition: Eight lectures given at the Lowell Institute, New York: Charles Scribner's Sons, 1891.
 Some neglected characteristics of the New England Puritans, 1892
 William Shakespeare, a study in Elizabethan literature, New York: C. Scribner's Sons, 1894.
 Rankell’s remains: An American novel, New York: C. Scribner's Sons, 1896.
 A literary history of America, New York: C. Scribner's Sons, 1901.
 Ralegh in Guiana, Rosamond, and a Christmas Masque, New York: C. Scribner's Sons, 1902 (Boston: Merrymount Press)
 The France of today, New York: C. Scribner, 1907.
 The privileged classes, New York: C. Scribner's Sons, 1908.
 The mystery of education, and other academic performances, New York: C. Scribner's Sons, 1909.
 The traditions of European literature, from Homer to Dante, New York: C. Scribner's Sons, 1920.

See also
Mark Antony De Wolfe Howe  
The Harvard Monthly

References

Further reading

External links

 
 Barrett Wendell genealogy chart

1855 births
1921 deaths
Members of the Harvard Board of Overseers
Academic staff of the University of Paris
Academics of the University of Cambridge
The Harvard Lampoon alumni
Harvard University faculty
Harvard Crimson baseball coaches
Harvard Crimson baseball players
American academics of English literature